Dolní Domaslavice is a municipality and village in Frýdek-Místek District in the Moravian-Silesian Region of the Czech Republic. It has about 1,400 inhabitants.

Geography
Dolní Domaslavice lies in the historical region of Cieszyn Silesia, in the Moravian-Silesian Foothills. The municipality is located on the eastern shore of Žermanice Dam.

History
The first written mention of Dolní Domaslavice is in a Latin document of Diocese of Wrocław called Liber fundationis episcopatus Vratislaviensis from around 1305 as item in Domaslawitz utroque. It meant that there were already two villages of that name (utroque meaning "both" in Latin), the other being Horní Domaslavice. Politically, Dolní Domaslavice belonged initially to the Duchy of Teschen, from 1327 a fee of the Kingdom of Bohemia.

After Revolutions of 1848 in the Austrian Empire a modern municipal division was introduced in the re-established Austrian Silesia. The village as a municipality was subscribed to the political and legal district of Cieszyn. According to the censuses conducted in 1880–1910 the population of the municipality grew from 955 in 1880 to 1061 in 1910 with a majority being native Czech-speakers (between 88.3% and 92.4%) accompanied by a small Polish-speaking minority (between 3.2% and 10.6%) and German-speaking people (at most 41 or 4.4% in 1880). In terms of religion in 1910 majority were Roman Catholics (94.3%), followed by Protestants (53 or 5%) and Jews (7 people).

After World War I, Polish–Czechoslovak War and the division of Cieszyn Silesia in 1920, it became a part of Czechoslovakia. Following the Munich Agreement, in October 1938 together with the Zaolzie region it was annexed by Poland, administratively adjoined to Cieszyn County of Silesian Voivodeship. It was then annexed by Nazi Germany at the beginning of World War II. After the war it was restored to Czechoslovakia.

The construction of Žermanice Dam on Lučina River in years 1951–1958 led to a partial flooding of Dolní Domaslavice, including the historical centre of the village, and detachment of the eastern territory of the municipality to form a new municipality of Lučina in 1956. Some hamlets from the surrounding municipalities were connected to Dolní Domaslavice.

References

External links

 

Villages in Frýdek-Místek District
Cieszyn Silesia